Carlinhos is a Portuguese nickname that is a diminutive form of Carlos.  Notable people referred to by this name include the following:

Nickname
Carlinhos Pandeiro de Ouro (born 1940), born Carlos de Oliveira, Brazilian percussionist
Carlinhos Brown (born 1962), born Antonio Carlos Santos de Freitas, Brazilian singer
Carlos Gracie Jr., nicknamed "Carlinhos", (born 1956) Brazilian jiu-jitsu practitioner and instructor

Football

Carlinhos (footballer, born 1937) (1937–2015), born Luís Carlos Nunes da Silva, Brazilian defensive midfielder
Carlinhos Bala (born 1979), born José Carlos da Silva Brazilian striker
Carlinhos (footballer, born 1980), born Carlos Alberto de Almeida Jr., Brazilian midfielder
Carlinhos (footballer, born 1981), born Carlos Roberto da Silva Santos, Brazilian striker
Carlinhos (footballer, born 1983), born Carlos Henrique Carneiro Marinho, Brazilian rightback
Carlinhos Paraíba (born 1983), born Carlos Pereira Berto Júnior, Brazilian midfielder
Carlinhos (footballer, born 1984), born Carlos César Matheus, Brazilian defensive midfielder
Carlinhos (footballer, born January 1986), born Carlos Henrique de Oliveira, Brazilian centre-back
Carlinhos (footballer, born November 1986), born Carlos Emiliano Pereira Brazilian leftback
Carlos Leonel (born 1987), sometimes referred to as Carlinhos, Portuguese forward
Carlinhos (footballer, born 1987), born Carlos Andrade Souza, Brazilian leftback
Carlinhos (footballer, born 1990), born Carlos Alberto Rogger Dias, Brazilian wingback
Carlinhos (footballer, born June 1994), born Carlos Vinícius Santos de Jesus, Brazilian midfielder
Carlinhos (footballer, born August 1994), born Carlos Antonio de Souza Júnior, Brazilian forward
Carlinhos (footballer, born 1995), born Carlos Sténio Fernandes Guimarães do Carmo, Angolan midfielder
Carlinhos (footballer, born 1997), born Carlos Moisés de Lima, Brazilian forward

See also

Carlinos

Notes

Portuguese masculine given names